Joshua or Josh Mills may refer to:

 Joshua Mills (Australian politician) (1859–1943), MP in Western Australia
 Joshua Mills (mayor) (1797–1843), mayor of Cleveland, Ohio
 Josh Mills, American actor in Hobgoblins 2